Unseeded Thomas Enqvist defeated Chuck Adams 6–2, 6–1 to win the 1995 Benson and Hedges Open singles competition. Magnus Gustafsson was the champion but did not defend his title.

Seeds
A champion seed is indicated in bold text while text in italics indicates the round in which that seed was eliminated.

  Wayne Ferreira (first round)
  Alexander Volkov (semifinals)
  MaliVai Washington (first round)
  Javier Sánchez (second round)
  Chuck Adams (final)
  Fabrice Santoro (first round)
  Jonas Björkman (first round)
  Cédric Pioline (quarterfinals)

Draw

External links
 ATP Singles draw

Singles
ATP Auckland Open